Wek or WEK may refer to:

Alek Wek (born 1977), South Sudanese-British model
Hong Kong West Kowloon railway station, Hong Kong, MTR station code WEK
West Kensington tube station, London, London Underground station code WEK